Al-Qahtaniyah Subdistrict  is a subdistrict of Qamishli District in northeastern al-Hasakah Governorate, northeastern Syria. The administrative centre is the town of al-Qahtaniyah.

At the 2004 census, the subdistrict had a population of 65,685.

Cities, towns and villages

References 

Qamishli District
Qamishli